Hawley Beach is a rural and residential locality in the local government area (LGA) of Latrobe in the north-west and west region of Tasmania. The 2016 census has a population of 484 for the state suburb of Hawley Beach.
It is  a locality and seaside resort town  from the nearest main town (Devonport). Nearby is the small town of Port Sorell and locality of Shearwater.

Hawley Beach is known for its minute red sand crabs, hooded plovers and reasonable fishing.  It borders the Rubicon Estuary, which has been identified by BirdLife International as an Important Bird Area because of its importance for waders, especially pied oystercatchers.

History
Hawley Beach Post Office opened on 2 November 1965 and closed in 1992.
Hawley Beach was gazetted as a locality in 1955.

Geography
The waters of Bass Strait form part of the western boundary, and all of the northern and eastern boundaries.

Road infrastructure
Route C708 (Alexander Street) provides access to the locality, terminating at the southern boundary.

References

Localities of Latrobe Council
Towns in Tasmania